Gavin Mills (born ) is a South African rugby union player for the  in the Pro14. His regular position is scrum-half.

Mills attended and played first team rugby for Hoër Landbouskool Boland. He was contracted by the Port Elizabeth-based Pro14 franchise the  prior to the 2019–20 season.

References

South African rugby union players
Living people
2000 births
Rugby union scrum-halves
Southern Kings players